Kirovsk is the name of several inhabited localities in Russia.

Urban localities
Kirovsk, Leningrad Oblast, a town in Kirovsky District of Leningrad Oblast
Kirovsk, Murmansk Oblast, a town in Murmansk Oblast

Rural localities
Kirovsk, Orenburg Oblast, a settlement in Kirovsky Selsoviet of Kvarkensky District in Orenburg Oblast